The New Zealand cricket team toured South Africa for cricket matches in the 2005–06 season. Owing to South Africa's busy schedule, the tour was split into two legs, one to be played in October 2005 with the six limited overs matches (one Twenty20 International and five One Day Internationals), and the second leg to be played in April and May 2006, including three Test matches. Before the limited overs series began, New Zealand were ranked third on the ICC ODI Championship table, two places ahead of their hosts South Africa. However, New Zealand had never won an ODI series in South Africa before this tour, and they were not to do it this summer either. In fact, New Zealand did not win a single one of the five matches, and only the rain – which sent the fourth match into a no-result – prevented the Kiwis from going down 0–5. The test series was similarly disappointing for New Zealand, with South Africa claiming it 2-0. After two series losses to Australia it was a satisfying result for the South Africans.

Squads

The New Zealand squad of 15 players for the ODI series of the tour was announced on 26 September 2005. Chris Cairns was excluded over fitness issues while Jeetan Patel was included following good performances during the Zimbabwe tour the previous season. From the ODI squad that toured the Caribbean earlier that year, the South Africa squad had Herschelle Gibbs included for the First ODI, who was out due to injury, in place of Justin Ontong. Albie Morkel was drafted only for the T20I fixture in the same squad. AB de Villiers, who was named in squads for both ODI and T20I series, was released to play domestic cricket for his side, the Titans, thus missing the lone T20I and the First ODI fixtures, as part of the player-rotation policy employed by the selectors. While he returned to the squad for the Second ODI, Andrew Hall left to play domestic cricket. Boeta Dippenaar, who picked up an injury during the First ODI, was ruled out of the remainder of the series and was replaced by Andrew Puttick. Puttick was replaced by Jacques Rudolph for the Third ODI. In their 13-man squad announced for the final two ODIs, Gibbs and Nicky Boje, who announced dropping out of the India tour, were replaced by Hall and Morkel for South Africa.

The New Zealand squad for the Test series was announced on 28 March 2006. Two additions were made to the squad that was playing the West Indies. Opening batsman Michael Papps was recalled to the side alongside all-rounder Jacob Oram. Shane Bond was ruled of the First Test after he sustained a knee injury in the four-day warm-up game. Kyle Mills was named his replacement in the playing XI. For the Second Test, Michael Mason was added to the squad his cover. While Bond was ruled out for the series, Hamish Marshall pulled out due to a rib injury following the First Test.

A 16-man South Africa squad for the Test was announced on 9 April. The same squad named for the completed home series against Australia was named. Gibbs and Kruger were dropped from the squad for the Second and Tests after poor performances in the First.

Tour matches

50-over: South Africa A v New Zealanders

50-over: South Africa A v New Zealanders

Four-day: Rest of South Africa v New Zealanders

T20I series

Only T20I

ODI series

First ODI

Second ODI

Third ODI

Fourth ODI

Fifth ODI

Test series

First Test

Second Test

Third Test

References

External links 
 Tour home at ESPNcricinfo
 

2005 in New Zealand cricket
2006 in New Zealand cricket
International cricket competitions in 2005–06
2005-06
2005–06 South African cricket season
2005 in South African cricket
2006 in South African cricket